The 20th Golden Raspberry Awards were held on March 25, 2000 at the Sheraton Hotel in Santa Monica, California to recognize the worst the film industry had to offer in 1999.

Included with the normal Golden Raspberry categories to mark the dawn of the year 2000 were four special awards: Worst Picture of the Decade, Worst New Star of the Decade, Worst Actor of the Century, and Worst Actress of the Century.

Robert Conrad, who played the lead role of James T. West in the 1960s television series The Wild Wild West created by Michael Garrison, showed up at the ceremony where he accepted three awards on behalf of the cinematic version of Wild Wild West, including Worst Picture as a way of expressing his disapproval with the film adaptation.

Awards and nominations

Worst of the Century, Decade

Films with multiple nominations 
These films received multiple nominations:

See also

1999 in film
72nd Academy Awards
53rd British Academy Film Awards
57th Golden Globe Awards
6th Screen Actors Guild Awards

References
 

Golden Raspberry Awards
Golden Raspberry Awards ceremonies
2000 in American cinema
2000 in California
March 2000 events in the United States
Golden Raspberry